The Valdosta State Blazers represent the Valdosta State University in football. The Blazers are a member of the Gulf South Conference (GSC) in NCAA Division II. Valdosta State University has had a football team since 1981.  Valdosta State has competed in six NCAA Division II National Football Championships and won four (2004, 2007, 2012, 2018), with losses in 2002 and 2021.  The Blazers have also compiled nine GSC Championships (1996, 2000, 2001, 2002, 2004, 2010, 2018, 2019, 2021).

Seasons

Sources
2012 Blazer Record Book
Blazer Football Season Results

References

Valdosta State Blazers
 
Valdosta State Blazers football seasons